Pile of Poo (💩), also known informally as the poomoji (slang), poop emoji (American English), or poo emoji (British English), is an emoji resembling a coiled pile of feces, usually adorned with cartoon eyes and a large smile. Originated from Japan, it is used as an expression of various contexts. Some possible uses include: as a response of passive aggressive emotion, for comedic value, as commentary on what's bad, or as its literal meaning.

The emoji is in the Miscellaneous Symbols and Pictographs Unicode block: .

History

A smiling and steaming pile of poo emoji first appeared in the set of 90 emoji for the J-Phone released in 1997. Public exposure to this set was limited by high device costs. J-Phone subsequently became Vodafone Japan, and is now known as SoftBank Mobile.

In 1998/99, Japanese mobile operators NTT DoCoMo, au by KDDI, and SoftBank Mobile each defined their own variants of emoji using proprietary specifications. The first popular emoji set was created by NTT DoCoMo employee Shigetaka Kurita for the company's i-Mode service. Compared to SoftBank, au by KDDI included a pile of poo with a different design, without a smiley face.

In 2007, Google, looking to expand its presence in Japan and Asia as a whole, partnered with  develop emoji for Gmail, a project codenamed "Mojo". Gmail's design for the pile of poo emoji lacked a face and was circled above by animated flies. When deciding which emoji to include, Takeshi Kishimoto, Google's Japanese product manager, went directly to the manager of Gmail and convinced him that the pile of poo emoji was the "most useful" emoji. This was corroborated by a statistical analysis undertaken by Google to determine which emojis were the most popular among Japanese users. According to Google software engineer Darren Lewis, the pile of poo emoji was "way up there" in terms of popularity. Design for the emoji was left to Google Doodle artists Ryan Germick and Susie Sahim, who sought to put a "Google spin" on the existing emojis. They drew inspiration from the existing emoji designs as well as the character Poop-Boy from the Dr. Slump manga by Akira Toriyama. They limited themselves to a size of 15×15 pixels and colors used only in Google's logo.

Google first supported emoji in Gmail in October 2008, and Apple added Pile of Poo to iPhone OS within the first emoji release of Apple Color Emoji on 21 November 2008. Initially, Apple's emoji support was implemented for holders of a SoftBank SIM card; the emoji themselves were represented using SoftBank's Private Use Area scheme and mostly resembled the SoftBank designs.

Pile of Poo was added to Unicode in Unicode 6.0 in 2010, and to Unicode's official emoji documentation in 2015.

In January 2017 there was a public outcry when recently crowned Miss Belgium, Romanie Schotte, used a "pile of poo" in response to a racist comment about somebody in the background of one of her Instagram photos, many taking it to condone the comment. The Belgian Centre for Equal Opportunities and Opposition to Racism opened an investigation but found no wrongdoing on her part, while the man pictured unsuccessfully sued her over the incident.

In 2017, a "frowning pile of poo" emoji was shortlisted for inclusion in a future Unicode release. After negative feedback on this character from WG2 experts including Michael Everson and Andrew West, the frowning pile of poo emoji was removed from the list of emoji candidates.

Encoding
The Pile of Poo emoji is encoded as follows:

Popularity
ABC Newss Samantha Selinger-Morris states in her 2016 article that the smiling poop emoji is "one of the most popular emojis in existence" due to its "ineffable charm" and "ability to transcend language barriers and political differences". As such, it has been featured on Mylar birthday balloons and cupcakes. In 2016, a termite mound in Western Australia was transformed into a smiling poop emoji by a couple with supplies from Kmart. According to Wired, "the smiling pile of poo is something we can all identify with." 

The icon is a character in 2017's The Emoji Movie, voiced by Patrick Stewart.

See also
Face with Tears of Joy
Kin no unko

References

External links

 Pile of Poo at Emojipedia

Symbols introduced in 1997
Individual emoji
Feces